C-A-C is a cycle car that was produced in Chicago, Illinois from 1914 to 1916. The cycle car cost $425 open roadster, while for $650 the buyer got a closed-body cycle car. The engine was a water-cooled 12 hp four-cylinder which ran on gas.

Notes

Cyclecars
Brass Era vehicles
Cars introduced in 1914
Motor vehicle manufacturers based in Illinois